Fneitiq is a Syrian village in the Baniyas District in Tartous Governorate. According to the Syria Central Bureau of Statistics (CBS), Fneitiq had a population of 1,021 in the 2004 census.

References

Alawite communities in Syria
Populated places in Baniyas District